Jacqueline Lovell (born 9 December 1974) is an American actress born and raised in Southern California. During the 1990s, she modeled for magazines such as Playboy and Penthouse as Sara St. James, and was known for her roles in erotic videos and films. Throughout the 2000s, she mostly acted in television shows. In 2017 she created and directed a dark comedy miniseries, Forest Bathing: Friends W/Benefits, in which she also acted.

Filmography

Film

Television

References

External links

1974 births
Living people
American female models
Actresses from California
21st-century American women